Jimmi Bredahl Johansen (born 26 August 1967), known professionally as Jimmi Bredahl or Jimmy Bredahl, is a Danish former professional boxer. He is the former WBO world super featherweight champion. He is the older brother of former two-division world champion of boxing, Johnny Bredahl.

Professional career
In March 1989, Bredahl turned professional winning his first fight in Brædstrup, when Bredahl beat England's Des Gargano with a points decision over six rounds.

Title fights
Bredahl won his first title belt, the vacant EBU (European) super featherweight title, in March 1992 with an eleventh-round knockout win over France's Pierre Lorcy. The following weekend his brother Johnny won the bantamweight version of the European title.

In his next fight, later that year Bredahl won the WBO super featherweight title with a win over Daniel Londas. On the same bill his brother Johnny won the super flyweight version of the WBO title.

De La Hoya fight
Bredahl's highest profile fight in March 1994 at the Olympic Auditorium, Los Angeles, in the United States when he defended his WBO Super Featherweight belt super featherweight title. against Oscar De La Hoya. However, Bredahl suffered the first defeat of his career when De La Hoya beat Bredahl. After being on the canvas in the first and second rounds Bredahl lost by knockout in the tenth round to lose his title.

Bredahl then lost a European super featherweight title fight later that year to Jacobin Yoma.

Later career
After suffering these two straight defeats Bredahl then returned to the ring five months later and went on a string of ten straight victories including winning the IBO super featherweight title in 1996.

In his last fight of his career, Bredahl faced little fancied American Troy Dorsey. Bredahl retired from the fight between the 7th and 8th rounds and would never fight again.

See also
List of super-featherweight boxing champions

References

External links
 

Living people
1967 births
Super-featherweight boxers
World super-featherweight boxing champions
World Boxing Organization champions
International Boxing Organization champions
Danish male boxers
Olympic boxers of Denmark
Sportspeople from Copenhagen